Rainer Baumann (21 January 1930 -  5 October 2021) was a German former footballer.

References

External links
International record

1930 births
2021 deaths
People from Altenburg
German footballers
East German footballers
East Germany international footballers
FC Sachsen Leipzig players
1. FC Frankfurt players
1. FC Lokomotive Leipzig players
German male journalists
German journalists
DDR-Oberliga players
Association football midfielders